Dave's Picks Volume 3 is a three-CD live album by the rock band the Grateful Dead. It contains the complete concert recorded on October 22, 1971 at the Auditorium Theatre in Chicago, Illinois, with bonus tracks from the previous night's show at the same venue. It was released on August 1, 2012.

The two concerts were keyboardist Keith Godchaux's second and third performances with the Dead. Though still a keyboardist and singer with the band, at the time Ron "Pigpen" McKernan was too ill to tour. Godchaux's first appearance with the Dead was October 19, 1971, at Northrop Auditorium, Minneapolis, Minnesota. His sixth performance with the Grateful Dead, from the same tour, has been released as Download Series Volume 3. The band had played the Auditorium Theater (with McKernan) just two months prior,  performances which have been released in part on the album Dick's Picks Volume 35.

Dave's Picks Volume 3 is the third of the Dave's Picks series of Grateful Dead archival releases, the successor to the Road Trips series. It was produced as a limited edition of 12,000 copies.

Critical reception
On All About Jazz, Doug Collette said, "Previous entries in Grateful Dead archive series have documented the quietly courageous, not to mention authoritative, fashion, by which keyboardist Keith Godchaux made a place of himself in the iconic band's lineup late in 1971, having been enlisted when charter member Ron 'Pigpen' McKernan became too ill to tour regularly. But [none make] the case so vividly as does this latest entry in Dave's Pick's Volume 3."

Track listing

Disc 1
First set:
"Bertha" (Jerry Garcia, Robert Hunter) – 6:12
"Me and My Uncle" (John Phillips) – 3:24
"Tennessee Jed" (Garcia, Hunter) – 6:33
"Jack Straw" (Bob Weir, Hunter) – 5:01
"Loser" (Garcia, Hunter) – 7:28
"Playing in the Band" (Weir, Mickey Hart, Hunter) – 6:31
"Sugaree" (Garcia, Hunter) – 7:20
"Beat It On Down the Line" (Jesse Fuller) – 3:55
"Black Peter" (Garcia, Hunter) – 9:18
"Mexicali Blues" (Weir, John Perry Barlow) – 3:45
"Cold Rain and Snow" (traditional, arranged by Grateful Dead) – 6:11
"Me and Bobby McGee" (Kris Kristofferson, Fred Foster) – 5:57

Disc 2
"Comes a Time" (Garcia, Hunter) – 7:36
"One More Saturday Night" (Weir) – 4:37
Second set:
"Ramble On Rose" (Garcia, Hunter) – 6:27
"Cumberland Blues" (Garcia, Phil Lesh, Hunter) – 5:58
"That's It for the Other One" > – 28:06
"Cryptical Envelopment" (Garcia)
"Drums" (Bill Kreutzmann)
"The Other One" (Weir, Kreutzmann)
"Cryptical Envelopment" (Garcia)
"Deal" (Garcia, Hunter) – 5:33
"Sugar Magnolia" (Weir, Hunter) – 6:53
"Casey Jones" > (Garcia, Hunter) – 5:54
"Johnny B. Goode" (Chuck Berry) – 3:50

Disc 3
Bonus tracks – October 21, 1971, Auditorium Theatre:
"Truckin'"  (Garcia, Lesh, Weir, Hunter) – 11:11
"Big Railroad Blues" (Noah Lewis) – 3:27
"The Frozen Logger" (James Stevens) – 0:54
"Dark Star" > (Garcia, Hart, Kreutzmann, Lesh, Ron "Pigpen" McKernan, Weir, Hunter) – 14:57
"Sittin' on Top of the World" > (Walter Jacobs, Lonnie Carter) – 3:21
"Dark Star" > (Garcia, Hart, Kreutzmann, Lesh, McKernan, Weir, Hunter) – 2:12
"Me and Bobby McGee" (Kristofferson, Foster) – 6:16
"Brown-Eyed Women" (Garcia, Hunter) – 4:23
"St. Stephen" > (Garcia, Lesh, Hunter) – 5:54
"Johnny B. Goode" (Berry) – 4:14

Personnel

Grateful Dead
Jerry Garcia – lead guitar, vocals
Keith Godchaux – keyboards
Bill Kreutzmann – drums
Phil Lesh – electric bass, vocals
Bob Weir – rhythm guitar, vocals

Production
Produced by Grateful Dead
Produced for release by David Lemieux
CD mastering by Jeffrey Norman
Recorded by Rex Jackson
Executive producer: Mark Pincus
Associate producer: Doran Tyson
Archival research: Nicholas Meriwether
Tape research: Michael Wesley Johnson
Cover art: Scott McDougall
Photography: Chip Williams
Art direction and design: Steve Vance

References

2012 live albums
Rhino Entertainment live albums
03